Cacama carbonaria is a species of cicada in the family Cicadidae. It lives in Central America.

References

Further reading

 
 
 
 
 
 
 

Articles created by Qbugbot
Insects described in 1919
Cryptotympanini